The Sopwith Buffalo was a British armoured fighter/reconnaissance aircraft of the First World War. A single-engined biplane, two examples of the Buffalo were built by Sopwith to carry out reconnaissance missions low over the trenches while protected against machine-gun fire from the ground, but no production followed, with the end of the war removing the need for such an aircraft.

Development and design
In July 1918, the British Air Ministry requested Sopwith, who were already building the Sopwith Salamander armoured single-seat ground attack fighter, to  build an armoured two-seat aircraft to carry out the dangerous contact patrol mission. This mission involved flying at low altitude over the battlefield to locate and keep in contact with attacking forces, therefore keeping commanders in touch with the progress of the battle.  This exposed aircraft carrying out such missions to heavy small arms fire from enemy trenches, resulting in heavy casualties.

Sopwith's design, the 3F.2 Buffalo, was a single-engined tractor biplane, with its two-bay wooden wings taken from Sopwith's earlier Bulldog fighter. Like the Salamander, the forward fuselage was made out of armour plate, weighing about 750 lb (340 kg), with the bottom of the fuselage 0.315 in (8 mm) thick, with the sides and front of 0.179 in (5 mm) plate. The armoured box reached back to the observer's cockpit, protecting the crew together with the fuel tanks and pipes, the carburettor and the magnetos.

The first prototype flew on 19 September 1918, flying to France for evaluation in the field on 27 September. The second prototype, which had its armour extended further aft, flew in October.  While tests showed that the Buffalo had good performance, and promised to be an excellent contact patrol aircraft, the end of the war ended plans for large scale production.  The two prototypes were sent to No. 43 Squadron, serving with the British Army of Occupation at Bickendorf near Cologne, Germany, but were quickly damaged in crashes.

Operators 

Australian Flying Corps
No. 4 Squadron AFC  - One Buffalo was attached to No. 4 Squadron, it was used for tests and trials during October 1918.

Royal Air Force
No. 43 Squadron RAF

Specifications

See also

Notes

References

Bruce, J. M. British Aeroplanes 1914-18. London:Putnam, 1957. 
Bruce, J. M. "The First British Armoured Brigade",Part 3. Air International, April 1979, Vol 16 No. 4. Bromley, UK:Fine Scroll Publishing. pp. 182–190, 199–200.
Mason, Francis K. The British Fighter since 1912. Annapolis, Maryland, USA:Naval Institute Press, 1992. .
"Milestones:The Sopwith Machines". Flight, 6 February 1919. pp. 163–174.
Robertson, Bruce. Sopwith-The Man and his Aircraft. Letchworth, UK:Air Review, 1970. .

1910s British fighter aircraft
1910s British military reconnaissance aircraft
Buffalo
Single-engined tractor aircraft
Biplanes
Aircraft first flown in 1918
Rotary-engined aircraft